Cretocatocha is a genus of wood midges in the family Cecidomyiidae. The one described species - Cretocatocha mcalpinei - is only known from Canadian amber from the Late Cretaceous collected in Canada near Medicine Hat. This genus was established by American entomologist Raymond J. Gagne in 1977.

References

Cecidomyiidae genera

Insects described in 1977
Fossil taxa described in 1977
Monotypic Diptera genera
Taxa named by Raymond J. Gagne